U.S. Route 44 (US 44) is an east–west United States Numbered Highway that runs for  through four states in the Northeastern United States. The western terminus is at US 209 and New York State Route 55 (NY 55) in Kerhonkson, New York, a hamlet in the Hudson Valley region. The eastern terminus is at Route 3A in Plymouth, Massachusetts.

Route description

|-
|  || 
|-
|  || 
|-
|  || 
|-
|  || 
|-
| Total || 
|}

New York

US 44 begins at an intersection with US 209 and NY 55 west of the hamlet of Kerhonkson in the town of Wawarsing in Ulster County. NY 55, concurrent with US 209 southwest of this point, turns east onto US 44, forming an overlap as the two routes proceed eastward across Ulster County. Midway between Kerhonkson and Gardiner and just north of NY 299, US 44 and NY 55 traverse a hairpin turn made necessary by the surrounding Shawangunk Ridge.

Farther east, the road passes through the hamlets of Gardiner and Clintondale, and meets US 9W in the hamlet of Highland. Just inside of Gardiner, the highway passes through Minnewaska State Park, a large state park in the Hudson Valley. US 44 and NY 55 join US 9W for roughly a half-mile southward along the western bank of the Hudson River before separating at a trumpet interchange south of Highland. One mile east of US 9W, US 44 and NY 55 cross the Hudson on the Mid-Hudson Bridge.

On the opposite bank in Dutchess County, US 44 and NY 55 enter the city of Poughkeepsie. In the downtown area, US 44 and NY 55 connect with US 9 by way of an interchange before splitting into a pair of parallel one-way streets. At the eastern end of the parallel roadways in Arlington, just outside Poughkeepsie, US 44 and NY 55 split upon meeting Main Street at an interchange. NY 55 continues southeast through the junction as Manchester Road; US 44, however, joins Main Street to the northeast along what becomes the Dutchess Turnpike. West of the interchange, state maintenance continues along Main Street for an additional  to County Route 38 (CR 38, named Fairmont Avenue). This segment of Main Street is designated as NY 983W, an unsigned reference route. Past CR 38, Main Street becomes CR 114.

From Arlington, US 44 bends first to the north, then after 1.5 miles northeast, through  intermittently developed areas, woodlots, and farms to the next settlement along its route, Pleasant Valley. In its commercial center the road widens to include a center turn lane. After crossing Wappinger Creek, it returns to two lanes.

The road returns to a more easterly course for two miles, then straightens out as it climbs steadily past the Newcomb–Brown Estate. It crests just before the interchange with the Taconic State Parkway. A mile past it, at the state police Troop K barracks, NY 82 joins from the north and the two roads overlap.

This concurrency ends after another mile, when US 44 diverges along the route of the former NY 44A, going around the village of Millbrook past the Mary Flagler Cary Arboretum, home to the Institute of Ecosystem Studies. The highway returns to a more due-east orientation as it passes north of the village, then gradually curves to the northeast again as it passes through a heavily farmed area.

US 44 gradually descends into the upper Harlem Valley, with a sharp hairpin turn providing a panoramic view to the south. A gradual descent takes it into downtown Amenia. At the center of town, the highway turns north and replaces NY 343 as NY 22's overlap.

A seven-mile (11 km) journey over increasingly rolling and open terrain takes the two highways into the town of North East and towards Millerton. Just south of the village, NY 199 reaches its eastern terminus. The road enters Millerton on South Elm Street, making a sharp turn north that necessitates a concrete barrier and a lower speed limit just south of downtown.

At the traffic light just north of that bend, US 44 leaves NY 22 and turns right through Millerton's historic downtown. Maple Avenue on the south marks the former northern terminus of NY 361. After that junction, US 44 leaves the village. It passes some strip development on the south, bends slightly to the north and crosses the Connecticut state line just past a car dealership on the south.

Connecticut
For most of its journey through Connecticut, US 44 is known as the Jonathan Trumbull Highway. It is also known by more local names, including Albany Turnpike in Canton, West/East Main Street and Avon Mountain Road in Avon, Albany Avenue through West Hartford into Hartford, Boston Turnpike from Bolton Notch to Ashford, and Providence Pike near the Rhode Island border.

After entering the state from the town of North East, New York just east of the village of Millerton, US 44 is a rural arterial road. It is briefly duplexed with Route 41 for  through the center of Salisbury. After crossing into North Canaan, it is duplexed with US 7 for  through the village of Canaan. After leaving the village, it enters Norfolk, where it has a brief concurrency with Route 272 in the center of town. After passing through the western part of Colebrook it enters the town of Winchester. As US 44 enters the village of Winsted, it begins a  concurrency with Route 183,  of which is joined by Route 8 in a triplex. At the east end of the village, Route 8 leaves to the south on an expressway, while Route 183 leaves to the south about 100 yards later. US 44 continues southeast through the towns of Barkhamsted, and New Hartford before entering Canton. In Canton, US 44 becomes a four-lane primary suburban arterial road as it is joined by US 202 for a  concurrency to the center of Avon. As US 202 leaves to the north, US 44 is joined for the next  by Route 10.

After climbing Avon Mountain, it enters West Hartford, passing along the northern part of the town and becoming an urban street as it entes the northern part of Hartford. After passing along Albany Avenue, and Main Street, US 44 turns east onto a pair of one-way streets (Morgan Street North and Morgan Street South) that straddle I-84 and US 6 and cross under I-91 with the only direct access being from Morgan Street South to I-91 South. It briefly duplexes with US 5 on Main Street in East Hartford center before turning east onto Burnside Avenue. After entering Manchester, it meets I-84 once again at exit 60, and is joined in a concurrency for the next  by US 6, which leaves its I-84 concurrency at this point.

The road then enters Bolton, where it meets the eastern terminus of I-384 at Bolton Notch. US 44 and US 6 briefly join the stub end of the expressway before US 6 splits off to the southeast. US 44 becomes more of a secondary rural road as it enters Coventry, where it briefly overlaps with Route 31. It then enters Mansfield, where it meets Route 195, which provides access to the University of Connecticut. After passing through Ashford, and Eastford, it turns north at Route 101 in Pomfret, which provides a more direct route to Providence. Shortly thereafter, Route 169 joins for a  concurrency to the center of town. US 44 once again turns east, and then enters the town of Putnam. After a  concurrency with Route 12, it meets I-395 at exit 47.  to the east, US 44 crosses the Rhode Island state line into the town of Glocester.

Rhode Island

US 44 runs  in Rhode Island. During this part of the road, US 44 is often referred to locally as "Putnam Pike" as the road runs through Rhode Island and into Putnam, Connecticut. US 44 enters the state at Glocester, traveling through Chepachet and Harmony, villages of Glocester, as it heads through the Waterman Reservoir towards the village of Greenville in the town of Smithfield. US 44 has a junction with I-295 in Smithfield at a cloverleaf interchange. Soon after the I-295 junction, US 44 enters the town of North Providence along Smith Street, then enters the city proper of Providence after another . In downtown Providence, US 44 separates into one-way pairs. Eastbound US 44 runs along Canal Street and South Water Street (via a section of Memorial Boulevard). Westbound US 44 runs along South Main Street and North Main Street. US 44 joins I-195/US 6 at Exit 1B as they cross the Seekonk River into East Providence. US 44 leaves I-195/US 6 at Exit 1C just after crossing the river and continues east towards the Massachusetts state line along Taunton Avenue.

Massachusetts
It enters the state in the town of Seekonk along Taunton Avenue. It continues through the towns of Rehoboth and Dighton along the way to the city of Taunton. It continues eastward from Taunton through the towns of Raynham, Lakeville, Middleborough, Carver, Plympton and Kingston before reaching its eastern terminus at Plymouth. US 44 has interchanges with Route 24 in Raynham and with Interstate 495 in Middleborough. East of the Middleborough Rotary, US 44 becomes an arterial highway for five miles (8 km) until just past the intersection with Route 105, where it turns into a two-lane freeway with a guard rail acting as a median divider for three miles (5 km) until just before the intersection with Route 58. After that, it becomes a newly built,  freeway section to Route 3 which bypasses the congested business district in Plymouth. US 44 has no access from Route 80 on the new bypass highway. (The old section of US 44 appeared on some maps starting in 2005 as Route 44A; however, Route 44A signs were not put up after the bypass was built, and the route has not appeared in the official route log of the Massachusetts Department of Transportation.)

In Rehoboth, US 44 passes near Anawan Rock, site of the capture of Anawan, the War Chief of the Pocasset People, in 1676. His capture marked the end of King Philip's War. In Middleborough, it passes by Oliver Mill Park, site of Judge Peter Oliver's 18th-century industrial complex. Ancient stone-walled waterways still remain here on the banks of the Nemasket River.

In Taunton, US 44 takes on a more urban character as it cuts through the heart of the city. The route runs along the south side of Taunton Green, flanked by shops, businesses, and government buildings.

History

New York

The portion of US 44 between Poughkeepsie and Amenia was the main line of an early toll road known as the Dutchess Turnpike. The turnpike continued past Amenia into the Connecticut town of Sharon along modern NY 343. Between the Wallkill River near the hamlet of Gardiner and the hamlet of Ardonia, modern US 44 was also roughly located along another early toll road known as the Farmer's Turnpike. The Farmer's Turnpike continued east past Ardonia to the village of Milton where a ferry across the Hudson River once existed.

In 1924, when state highways were first marked by route numbers in New York, the main line of the Dutchess Turnpike was designated as NY 21. Other portions of modern US 44, aside from the overlap with NY 22, were unnumbered in the 1920s. In the 1930 renumbering of state highways in New York, the old NY 21 was partitioned into three numbered routes. Between Poughkeepsie and South Millbrook, old NY 21 became the western half of NY 200, which continued east to Dover Plains using the Dover branch route of the Dutchess Turnpike (modern NY 343). The section from South Millbrook to Amenia became part of NY 82A, which continued past Amenia to Pine Plains. The easternmost section from Amenia to the Connecticut line was designated as NY 343. West of the Hudson River, NY 55 was also designated in 1930 between Barryville and Pawling, running along the portion of modern US 44 between Kerhonkson and Poughkeepsie.

US 44 was assigned . West of the Hudson River, it was overlaid on the pre-existing NY 55, with US 44 officially beginning at US 209, which was also extended into New York . East of the river, US 44 was routed on the original Dutchess Turnpike main line from Poughkeepsie to Amenia, supplanting NY 200 west of South Millbrook, NY 82A west of Amenia, and a short portion of NY 343 between NY 82A and the hamlet of Amenia. US 44 left the turnpike at Amenia and followed NY 22 north to Millerton, where it continued east on a short piece of former NY 199 into Connecticut. The alignments of NY 200 and NY 343 were flipped as part of US 44's assignment.

US 44 originally entered the village of Millbrook via NY 82, North Avenue, and Franklin Avenue. On April 1, 1980, the state of New York assumed ownership of a highway bypassing Millbrook to the west and north as part of a highway maintenance swap between the state and Dutchess County. The newly acquired roadway was designated as NY 44A. On June 5, 2007, NYSDOT announced that US 44 would be permanently realigned onto NY 44A. All shields along NY 44A were replaced with US 44 signage, and the NY 44A designation ceased to exist. NYSDOT will continue to perform maintenance on US 44's former routing through Millbrook. The portion of the routing that did not overlap NY 82 is now NY 984P, an unsigned reference route.

Connecticut
Most of the alignment of modern US 44 in Connecticut was at one time part of an early network of turnpikes in the state during the 19th century. From the New York state line at Salisbury to the village of Lakeville, the route was the westernmost section of the Salisbury and Canaan Turnpike. Between North Canaan and New Hartford, modern US 44 was known as the Greenwoods Turnpike. The southeastward continuation of the Greenwoods road to the West Hartford-Hartford line was known as the Talcott Mountain Turnpike. From East Hartford to Eastford, the Boston Turnpike was chartered mostly along modern US 44 as the direct route from Hartford to Boston. The Boston Turnpike differed from modern US 44 by using a more direct route between Eastford and Pomfret Center along modern Route 244, while US 44 runs via the village of Abington. Past Pomfret Center, the Boston Turnpike diverged from modern US 44 heading northeast across the town of Thompson. The route through Putnam to the Rhode Island state line was a different turnpike road known as the Pomfret and Killingly Turnpike.

In 1922, the New England states designated route numbers on its main roads. Route 101 was assigned as the route used by the Pomfret and Killingly Turnpike (modern US 44) to Pomfret Center, then modern US 44 to Phoenixville via Abington (short portions of two other turnpike roads), then a road southward from Phoenixville to South Chaplin (modern Route 198), ending at New England Route 3. The direct road connecting Phoenixville to Bolton Notch was designated as Route 109. From Hartford to Bolton Notch, modern US 44 was at the time known as New England Route 3. West of Hartford, modern US 44 was designated as part of New England Route 17, which stretched in Connecticut from North Canaan to Stonington (via modern Route 2). Between the New York state line at Salisbury and North Canaan, the road was known as Route 121.

In 1926, most of New England Route 3 became U.S. Route 6. In the 1932 state highway renumbering, New England Route 17 was broken up into two newly assigned routes: modern Route 2 east of Hartford, and part of Route 101 west of Hartford. Route 101 was reconfigured in 1932 from its 1920s alignment to continue west of Phoenixville along former Route 109, then overlapping with US 6 to Hartford. Route 101 then used the western half of former New England Route 17 to North Canaan where it ended. The road from North Canaan to Salisbury was renumbered in 1932 to Route 199 to match the route number in New York at the time. In 1935, US 44 was designated and utilized Route 101 across the states of Connecticut, Rhode Island, and Massachusetts. Route 199 was also incorporated into the new route, connecting with the New York state line.

US 44A

In the 1940s, US 44 was relocated along a portion of the Wilbur Cross Highway for several years with the former surface alignment becoming US 44A. The change was later reversed. US 6 was also relocated in East Hartford and Manchester to use I-84 and the concurrency between US 6 and US 44 is now only between Manchester and Bolton Notch.

Rhode Island and Massachusetts

In the 19th century, almost all of the alignment of modern US 44 in Rhode Island was part of an early turnpike route. From the Connecticut line in Putnam to the Smithfield town line, what is now the Putnam Pike was part of the West Glocester Turnpike (Connecticut line to Chepachet) and the Glocester Turnpike (Chepachet to Smithfield line). The continuation of the road in Smithfield and North Providence was another turnpike road known as the Powder Hill Turnpike, running along the alignment of modern Smith Street. Between East Providence and Taunton, the road was part of yet another turnpike, the Taunton and Providence Turnpike, running along modern Taunton Avenue and Winthrop Street.

In 1922, when the New England states first assigned route numbers to its main thoroughfares, the route from Putnam through Providence and Taunton to Plymouth was designated as Route 101. Route 101 extended across Rhode Island and Massachusetts along modern US 44, with an extension into Connecticut along an alignment different from US 44. In 1932, Connecticut relocated its Route 101 to the modern US 44 alignment, with the route now extending across the three states from North Canaan in Connecticut to Plymouth in Massachusetts. In 1935, the multi-state Route 101 was incorporated into newly designated US 44. Connecticut and Rhode Island reassigned the Route 101 designation to a much shorter but parallel alignment between the two states.

On December 14, 2005, a freeway realignment opened to the north of the original surface alignment US 44 in the towns of Carver and Plymouth. US 44 was rerouted onto the new expressway and now runs concurrent with Route 3 from the latter freeway's exit 16 (old exit 7), where the new freeway ends, south to exit 15A (old exit 6A), where US 44 rejoins its former alignment.

Major intersections
Exit numbers concurrent with I-195 in Rhode Island converted to mileage-based exit numbering in 2020. Exit numbers concurrent with Route 3 in Massachusetts converted in late summer 2020.

See also

New York State Bicycle Route 44

References

External links

Interchange of the Week – Week 18
New York Road Map Travel Guide: United States #44 
 US 44 Expressway-Massachusetts on Bostonroads.com
 Endpoints of U.S. Highway 44

 
44
44
44
44
44
U.S. Route 44
Transportation in Ulster County, New York
Transportation in Dutchess County, New York
Transportation in Litchfield County, Connecticut
Transportation in Hartford County, Connecticut
Transportation in Tolland County, Connecticut
Transportation in Windham County, Connecticut
Transportation in Providence County, Rhode Island
Transportation in Bristol County, Massachusetts
Transportation in Plymouth County, Massachusetts